Fire & Ice is the sixth studio album by guitarist Yngwie Malmsteen, released on 7 February 1992 through Elektra Records. The album topped the Japanese albums chart, reached No. 121 on the US Billboard 200 and charted within the top 90 in the Netherlands, Sweden and Switzerland.

Critical reception

Steve Huey at AllMusic gave Fire & Ice three stars out of five, saying that it is "most successful when Malmsteen returns to the heavy baroque influence of his early work" and that "there are some fine longer compositions here that will please hardcore Yngwie fans." He criticised the album's single, "Teaser", as being "a flawed stab at radio rock" and sounding like "a generic, clichéd hair metal song with Malmsteen on guitar."

Track listing

Personnel

Yngwie Malmsteen – guitar, Moog Taurus, sitar, strings arrangement, backing vocals, producer
Göran Edman – lead vocals
Mats Olausson – keyboards
Bo Werner – drums (except track 8)
Michael Von Knorring – drums (track 8)
Svante Henryson – bass, cello, strings arrangement assistance
Per Bögberg – viola
Ulf Forsberg – violin
Svein-Harald Martinsen – violin
Kalle Moraeus – violin
Lolo Lannerbäck – flute
Simon Hanhart – engineering
Keith Rose – engineering assistance
Steve Thompson – mixing
Michael Barbiero – mixing
George Marino – mastering

Chart performance

Certifications

See also
List of Oricon number-one albums of 1992

References

External links
Fire & Ice, 1992 at yngwiemalmsteen.com
In Review: Yngwie J. Malmsteen "Fire And Ice" at Guitar Nine Records

Yngwie Malmsteen albums
1992 albums
Elektra Records albums